Emydocephalus orarius, also known as the white-crowned sea snake or white-naped sea snake, is a species of  elapid sea snake endemic to Australian waters. The specific epithet orarius (“coastal”) refers to its known habitat.

Description
The species grows up to 116 cm in length.

Distribution and habitat
The species has been recorded from soft-bottomed waters off the Kimberley, Pilbara and Gascoyne coasts of Western Australia, including Barrow, and Legendre Islands. The type locality is Shark Bay.

References

 
orarius
Fauna of the Indian Ocean
Snakes of Australia
Reptiles of Western Australia
Endemic fauna of Australia
Reptiles described in 2020